Joseph Marie François Volkmar Busch (20 November 1812 – 3 November 1893) was a Danish composer.  He studied music with Friedrich Wieck in Leipzig, and there became acquainted with Wieck's daughter Clara.

References

Danish classical composers
Danish male classical composers
Danish Romantic composers
Danish classical pianists
1812 births
1893 deaths
19th-century classical composers
19th-century classical pianists
19th-century Danish composers
Male classical pianists
19th-century male musicians
19th-century musicians